Matthew Rettenmund (born December 25, 1968) is the author of the novels Boy Culture and Blind Items: A (Love) Story, as well as the non-fiction books Encyclopedia Madonnica, Totally Awesome '80s, and Hilary Duff: All Access. He was the founding Editor in Chief of Popstar! Magazine from October 1998 until May 2012. He currently works at Telepictures in New York.

Rettenmund grew up in Flushing, Michigan and after he graduated from the University of Chicago, he moved to New York City, where he still lives.

His novel Boy Culture was adapted into an award-winning movie in 2006.

He has blogged at BoyCulture.com since November 2005.

External links
Edge Media New York

1968 births
Living people
American non-fiction writers
American gay writers
University of Chicago alumni